Daniel O'Rourke (died 4 August 1968) was an Irish politician and sportsman.

He was born in the townland of Tents, near Manorhamilton, County Leitrim, but soon moved to County Roscommon, basing himself in Castlerea, where he worked as a teacher. He was a Gaelic footballer and later president of the Gaelic Athletic Association (GAA). He was a member of Roscommon County Council for 40 years, and a Teachta Dála (TD) for periods between 1921 and 1951.

He was elected unopposed as a Sinn Féin TD to the 2nd Dáil at the 1921 elections for the Mayo South–Roscommon South constituency. He said later that his election came as a surprise to him, as he did not know he had been nominated and did not want to be. Although he opposed the Anglo-Irish Treaty, he voted in favour of it, as he believed the alternative of further war was worse. He was re-elected unopposed as a pro-Treaty Sinn Féin TD at the 1922 general election. He resigned his seat on 29 November 1922. He stood as a Fianna Fáil candidate at the September 1927 general election but was not elected.

He was elected as a Fianna Fáil TD at the 1932 general election for the Roscommon constituency but lost his seat at the 1933 general election. He was re-elected at the 1937 and 1938 general elections but again lost his seat at the 1943 general election. He was re-elected at the 1944 and 1948 general elections but once again lost his seat at the 1951 general election. At the 1951 Seanad election, he was elected on the Labour Panel. He stood unsuccessfully at the 1954 and 1957 general elections.

He played football for the Roscommon county team, founded the Tarmon GAA club, and was president of the GAA from 1946 to 1949.

References

 
 

Year of birth missing
1968 deaths
Alumni of De La Salle Teacher Training College, Waterford
Early Sinn Féin TDs
Fianna Fáil senators
Irish schoolteachers
Irish sportsperson-politicians
Members of the 2nd Dáil
Members of the 3rd Dáil
Members of the 7th Dáil
Members of the 9th Dáil
Members of the 10th Dáil
Members of the 12th Dáil
Members of the 13th Dáil
Members of the 7th Seanad
Politicians from County Roscommon
Presidents of the Gaelic Athletic Association
Roscommon inter-county Gaelic footballers
Fianna Fáil TDs